The Haslingden Canal was a proposed canal link between the Bury arm of the Manchester Bolton & Bury Canal in Greater Manchester, England, and the Leeds and Liverpool Canal in Accrington, England, passing through Haslingden.   Authorised by an Act of Parliament in 1794, the canal was not built.

The proposed canal would have been broad gauge,  in length, and would have used an inclined plane in place of locks.

History
The Leeds and Liverpool Canal had been authorised by Act of Parliament in 1770, and by 1777, a long section at the eastern end from Leeds to Gargrave was open, as was another section at the western end from Wigan to Liverpool. There was then a pause until 1790, when work began again on the middle section, but its precise route was still under discussion. At the time, the Rochdale Canal was being promoted, which would provide an alternative crossing of the Pennines, and some of the shareholders were suggesting that the central section was therefore not necessary, and that the canal should be re-routed to serve towns in East Lancashire. In addition, the Lancaster Canal was being promoted, the southern section of which would cut across the route of the Leeds and Liverpool on its way from Preston to Westhoughton, while the Manchester Bolton & Bury Canal were promoting an extension westwards from Bolton to Red Moss, to the south of Horwich, which would only be successful if the Leeds and Liverpool would connect to it. The Leeds and Liverpool instructed their engineers, Robert Whitworth and Joseph Priestley, to survey a branch to Red Moss.

There were suggestions that the Leeds and Liverpool should be linked to the Rochdale by building a branch between Burnley and Todmorden, and an increasing number of shareholders were convinced that the canal should be routed further east. Whitworth and Priestley presented a report, which outlined a plan to re-route the Newburgh to Bamber Bridge section through Duxbury, Red Moss, where there would be a junction with the Manchester Bolton & Bury Canal, Westhoughton, Hindley and Platt Bridge, where it would join the River Douglas Navigation. It was  longer, but all on one level, and avoided the water supply problems likely with the Red Moss route.

In 1792, the Manchester Bolton & Bury company proposed extending their Bury Branch to Rochdale, but agreed to drop the plan if the Leeds and Liverpool would build their line via Red Moss. The Leeds and Liverpool decided that a link to the Rochdale Canal would be better than an extension of the Bury Branch, and approved the East Lancashire diversion via Red Moss in February 1792. A bill to authorise it was presented to Parliament in 1793, but was defeated by the combined opposition of the Lancaster Canal and the Duke of Bridgewater.

At this point, the Haslingden Canal was proposed, as an additional link between the Manchester Bolton & Bury Canal at Bury and the Leeds and Liverpool at Church, near Accrington. Engineers from both canals had decided it was feasible, and William Bennet had worked on the detailed design. An Act of Parliament was obtained by the promoters in April 1794, which failed to mention a junction with the Leeds and Liverpool Canal, even the Leeds and Liverpool believed there would be one. There were severe restrictions on water supply and locks, and if agreement could not be reached with three-quarters of the millers and factories affected, changes in level were to be achieved by "rollers, racks, inclined planes, or any other works, engines or machinery, as a substitute for locks." The company had powers to raise £47,000 by issuing shares, and an additional £40,000 if required, either by issuing more shares or by mortgaging the tolls.

There was an attempt in July 1794 to engage millowners in a discussion about how alternatives to locks might work, but the project appears to have faded away after that. In 1797, the company was wound up, and the Red Moss scheme was also abandoned at the same time. Hadfield and Biddle have suggested that the scheme might have been a political move, rather than a genuine proposal. In 1805, the Leeds and Liverpool decided to press ahead with the line to Red Moss, but reported that the Manchester Bolton & Bury were no longer ready to do so, although that company kept no record of the event. In 1810, common sense prevailed, and the Leeds and Liverpool agreed to share the southern end of the Lancaster Canal between Johnson's Hillock and Kirkless, near Wigan. Concessions on tolls agreed between the companies meant that a link to the Manchester Bolton & Bury was unlikely to be built.

See also

Canals of the United Kingdom
History of the British canal system

Bibliography

References

Canals in the Metropolitan Borough of Bury
Canals in Greater Manchester
History of the Metropolitan Borough of Bolton